Diane Cilento (2 April 1932 – 6 October 2011) was an Australian actress. She is best known for her film roles in Tom Jones (1963), which earned her an Academy Award nomination, Hombre (1967) and The Wicker Man (1973). She also received a Tony Award nomination for her performance as Helen of Troy in the play Tiger at the Gates.

Early life
Cilento was born in Mooloolaba, Queensland, the daughter of Phyllis (née McGlew) and Raphael Cilento, both medical practitioners in Queensland. She was the fifth of six children; four of her siblings became medical practitioners, while her sister Margaret was an artist. Cilento's paternal great-grandfather, Salvatore Cilento, arrived from Naples, Italy, in 1855. Her maternal grandfather was merchant and exporter Charles Thomas McGlew. 

It was from a young age that Cilento decided to follow a career as an actress. After being expelled from school in Australia, she was schooled in New York whilst living with her father. Cilento later won a scholarship to the Royal Academy of Dramatic Art and moved to Britain in the early 1950s.

Career

After graduation, Cilento found work on stage almost immediately and was signed to a five-year contract by Alexander Korda. Her first leading film role was in the British film Passage Home (1955), opposite fellow Australian Peter Finch.

She soon secured roles in British films and worked steadily until the end of the decade. In 1956, she was nominated for a Tony Award for Best Supporting or Featured Actress (Dramatic) for Helen of Troy in Jean Giraudoux's Tiger at the Gates. She was nominated for the Academy Award for Best Supporting Actress for her performance in Tom Jones in 1963 and appeared in The Third Secret the following year.

She starred with Charlton Heston in the 1965 film The Agony and the Ecstasy, and with Paul Newman in the 1967 western film Hombre, and had a supporting role in The Wicker Man (1973).

Cilento continued working as an actress, in films and television. In the 1980s, she settled in Mossman, north of Cairns, where she built her own outdoor theatre, named "Karnak", in the tropical rainforest. The venture allowed her to participate in experimental drama.

In 2001, she was awarded the Centenary Medal for "distinguished service to the arts, especially theatre".

Personal life
In 1955, Cilento married Andrea Volpe, an Italian aristocrat. She gave birth to their daughter Giovanna Volpe in 1957. Cilento and Volpe divorced in 1962.

In 1962, Cilento married actor Sean Connery. They had a son, Jason (born 1963), before separating in 1971 and divorcing in 1974. In her autobiography My Nine Lives, Cilento said that Connery was emotionally and physically abusive during their marriage.

In 1985, Cilento married playwright Anthony Shaffer, whom she met in 1972, while working on the film The Wicker Man. They remained together until his death in 2001.

Death
Cilento died of cancer at Cairns Base Hospital on 6 October 2011.

Filmography

Film

Television

Theatre

Writings
 1968: Manipulator. Charles Scribner's Sons.
 1972: Hybrid. Dell Publishing.
 2007: My Nine Lives. Penguin Books.

References

External links
 
 Diane Cilento at the British Film Institute
 Diane Cilento's Karnak Playhouse 
 "From Stardom to Sufism" – interview with Cilento by Rachael Kohn on ABC Radio National May 2006 (MP3/Podcast available)
 The Cilento Gift – a collection of books, memorabilia, posters, furniture and original scripts from Diane Cilento's estate

1932 births
2011 deaths
20th-century Australian actresses
21st-century Australian actresses
Alumni of RADA
Australian film actresses
Australian people of Italian descent
Australian stage actresses
Australian television actresses
Deaths from cancer in Queensland
People from the Sunshine Coast, Queensland
Recipients of the Centenary Medal
Queensland Greats